The Alliance of the Overseas was a French electoral coalition for the 2009 European elections in the Overseas constituency composed of left-wing overseas parties. The list was supported by the Left Front.

The list was composed of the Communist Party of Réunion (PCR), the Martinican Democratic Rally (RDM), the Guianese Socialist Party (PSG), and the Kanak and Socialist National Liberation Front (FLNKS) of New Caledonia.

It was widely seen as the successor to a similar alliance which topped the poll in the constituency in 2004, and on which Paul Vergès was elected MEP.

Leaders 

Overseas: Élie Hoarau (Indian Ocean Section)

The list received 21.01% of the vote, and Hoarau was elected MEP.

Defunct left-wing political party alliances
Defunct political party alliances in France
Parties represented in the European Parliament
Political parties of the French Fifth Republic
Left-wing nationalist parties